John Calvin Lee (January 7, 1828 – March 24, 1891) was an American Republican politician and soldier who served as the ninth lieutenant governor of Ohio from 1868 to 1872.

Biography
Lee was born January 7, 1828, at Brown Township, Delaware County, Ohio. He received a public education and attended Central College Franklin County for one year, went to Western Reserve College, known now as Case Western Reserve University, in 1845 and graduated in 1848. He taught school for two years, then began study of law at Atwater, Ohio, where he was admitted to the bar July 6, 1852. He ran for Common Pleas Judge in 1857, but lost.

War years
Whitelaw Reid wrote this of Lee's service:

Political career
In 1867, General Lee was nominated for lieutenant governor after Samuel Galloway declined the nomination. He won that year, and again in 1869.

In 1868, Lee was Delegate-at-large to the Republican National Convention, and in 1872 Presidential Elector-at-large. In 1877 he was appointed United States District Attorney for the Northern District of Ohio, for the term ending 1881.

Death
He died at Toledo on March 24, 1891.

References

External links

1828 births
1891 deaths
Lieutenant Governors of Ohio
People from Delaware County, Ohio
People from Tiffin, Ohio
Ohio Republicans
Ohio lawyers
Union Army colonels
People of Ohio in the American Civil War
Case Western Reserve University alumni
United States Attorneys for the Northern District of Ohio
1872 United States presidential electors
19th-century American politicians
19th-century American lawyers